Situated   from Khalanga in Malikarjun VDC, the Malikarjun Temple contains idols of Lord Shiva and Goddess Parvati.Malika is workshipped as Parbati while Arjun represents Shiva. Devotees throng this temple every year during the months of Ashadh and Kartik by Nepali calendar. Gaura Festival is also celebrated here with highly population of darchula in this temple. This temple is also famous for a journey which is done by walking a long and ending it in this temple. It is very famous in Darchula District.

References

Hindu temples in Sudurpashchim Province
Buildings and structures in Darchula District